Marianne Winkler was a West German luger who competed in the early 1960s. She won the silver medal in the women's singles at the 1961 FIL World Luge Championships in Girenbad, Switzerland.

References

External links
Hickok sports information on World champions in luge and skeleton
SportQuick.com information on World champions in luge 

German female lugers
Possibly living people
Year of birth missing